Al-Malik al-ʿĀdil Sayf ad-Dīn Abū Bakr ibn Nāṣir ad-Dīn Muḥammad (better known as al-Adil II) (c. 1221 – 9 February 1248) was the Ayyubid Sultan of Egypt from 1238 to 1240.

When his father al-Kamil, nephew of Saladin, died in 1238, al-Adil II followed him somewhat unprepared. When the country plunged into anarchy, his exiled half-brother, as-Salih Ayyub, seized the opportunity and deposed him. Al-Adil died in prison eight years later.

Contemporary Muslim historians wrote disapprovingly about al-Adil II's "boisterous living and loose morals". This is seemingly corroborated by an inlaid brass basin made for him by the master craftsman Ahmad al-Dhaki al-Mawsili which contains a "somewhat risqué" depiction of total nudity, the only known example from medieval Islamic metalwork.

See also
List of rulers of Egypt

References

1220s births
1248 deaths
Muslims of the Crusades
Ayyubid sultans of Egypt
Year of birth unknown
13th-century Ayyubid sultans of Egypt
13th-century Kurdish people